Sextus Hermentidius Campanus was a Roman senator, who was active during the Flavian dynasty. He was the 6th legate of Judaea from 93 to 97 and suffect consul in the nundinium of July to August 97 as the colleague of Lucius Domitius Apollinaris. He is known entirely from inscriptions.

Biography
His gentilicium "Hermentidius", derived from the god Hermes, suggests that Campanus' origins lie in Cappadocia, where there is evidence of a number of names incorporating the name of that deity. In any case, he is the only member of his family known to have acceded to the consulate.

The only office Campanus is known to have held, other than his consulate, is legatus legionis or commander of the Legio X Fretensis between the years 93 and 97, which was stationed during those years in Jerusalem. Command of this legion also made Campanus the de facto legate of Judea.

Edward Champlin has restored his name in the Testamentum Dasumii, which would attest that Campanus was alive at least as late as the year 108.

References

1st-century Romans
2nd-century Romans
1st-century Roman governors of Judaea
Suffect consuls of Imperial Rome
Roman governors of Judaea
2nd-century deaths